"My Own True Love" is a song written by Mack David and Max Steiner and made popular by Jimmy Clanton in 1959 and the Duprees in 1962. Jimmy Clanton's version peaked at No. 33 and the Duprees' version peaked at No. 13 on the Billboard Hot 100 singles chart.

Weekly charts

Jimmy Clanton version

The Duprees version

References

1962 singles
1962 songs
Songs written by Mack David